Caladenia pallida, commonly known as the rosy spider orchid, is a species of orchid endemic to Tasmania. It has a single dark green, hairy leaf and one or two yellowish to bright, rosy pink flowers. Individual plants of this species have not been seen since 1987.

Description 
Caladenia pallida is a terrestrial, perennial, deciduous, herb with a small underground tuber. Flowering occurs in October and November.

Taxonomy and naming 
Caladenia pallida was first described in 1840 by John Lindley and the description was published in The Genera and Species of Orchidaceous Plants. The specific epithet (pallida) is a Latin word  meaning "ashen", "pale" or "wan".

Distribution and habitat 
The rosy spider orchid has mostly been recorded in the central north and north-west of Tasmania, growing in open forest although the last sighting of the species was in 1987 on private land. Earlier collections were made between Hobart and New Norfolk.

Conservation
Caladenia pallida is classified as "Critically Endangered" under the Australian Government Environment Protection and Biodiversity Conservation Act 1999 and as "Endangered" under the Tasmanian Government Threatened Species Protection Act 1995. The main threats to the species are thought to be accidental damage due to the small population size, climate change and inappropriate fire regimes.

References 

pallida
Endemic orchids of Australia
Orchids of Tasmania
Plants described in 1840